Edwin Alexander González Valenzuela (born June 20, 1977) is a Salvadoran football (soccer) player, who plays defender for Municipal Limeño in the Salvadoran second division.

Club career
A rather short defender, González started his career at Luis Ángel Firpo before joining Municipal Limeño in 1998. After six years, he moved on to Águila together with his Municipal teammates Josué Galdámez and Deris Umanzor but he left them for Alianza a year later. He returned to Firpo in 2006 and to Municipal Limeño in January 2010, where he signed for two years.

González played for Luis Ángel Firpo in the 2008–09 CONCACAF Champions League Group Stage.

International career
Nicknamed Pelón, González made his debut for El Salvador in a March 2000 FIFA World Cup qualification against Belize and has earned a total of 4 caps, scoring 1 goal. He has represented his country in 2 FIFA World Cup qualification matches.

His final international game was his second FIFA World Cup qualification match against the United States in September 2004.

International goals
Scores and results list El Salvador's goal tally first.

References

External links

1977 births
Living people
People from San Miguel, El Salvador
Association football defenders
Salvadoran footballers
El Salvador international footballers
C.D. Águila footballers
Alianza F.C. footballers
C.D. Luis Ángel Firpo footballers